William Lee Morgan, nicknamed "Sack", is an American former Negro league pitcher who played in the 1940s.

Morgan made his Negro leagues debut in 1945 with the Baltimore Elite Giants. In nine recorded appearances on the mound for Baltimore, he worked 38.1 innings and posted a 3–3 record with 21 strikeouts. Morgan went on to play for the Memphis Red Sox in 1948.

References

External links
 and Seamheads

Year of birth missing
Year of death missing
Place of birth missing
Place of death missing
Baltimore Elite Giants players
Memphis Red Sox players
Baseball pitchers